Thallium(I) bromide is a chemical compound of thallium and bromine with a chemical formula TlBr. This salt is used in room-temperature detectors of X-rays, gamma-rays and blue light, as well as in near-infrared optics.

It is a semiconductor with a band gap of  2.68 eV.

The crystalline structure is of cubic CsCl type at room temperature, but it lowers to the orthorombic thallium iodide type upon cooling, the transition temperature being likely affected by the impurities. Nanometer-thin TlBr films grown on LiF, NaCl or KBr substrates exhibit a rocksalt structure.

Thallium is extremely toxic and a cumulative poison which can be absorbed through the skin. Acute and chronic effects of ingesting thallium compounds include fatigue, limb pain, peripheral neuritis, joint pain, loss of hair, diarrhea, vomiting, vision loss, and damage to central nervous system, liver and kidneys.

References

Cited sources

Bromides
Thallium(I) compounds
Metal halides
Caesium chloride crystal structure